Bonginkosi Dlamini (born 24 April 1977), popularly known as Zola 7, is a South African kwaito musician, actor, writer, TV presenter and poet. Dlamini began his career as an actor, achieving national recognition in the television series Yizo Yizo. He also starred in the hit Academy Awards winning film Tsotsi in 2005 which he wrote the musical score for. 

With a career spanning more than 20 years, Dlamini essentially got into music, releasing 9 songs.

Zola is a philanthropist and through his show "Zola 7", which aired on SABC1, he helped a lot of people achieve their personal and social development goals such as building libraries for their communities.

Biography and early life
Bonginkosi Dlamini was born on 24 April 1977 and grew up in Zola, a township of Soweto, notoriously known for its high crime rate. It is his childhood home town from which he adopted his name. Unemployment, alcoholism, and single parent families are very common in Zola. Dlamini's father, believed to be part of the Mchunu clan, abandoned the family, leaving his mother to care for him and his older brother and sister when they were young. Zola himself served time in prison as a juvenile for car theft.

Actor
Zola became well known for his role as the notorious gangster Papa Action in the second season of the television series Yizo Yizo. The character was already popular from the first season, where it had been portrayed by another actor. Zola resembled the previous performer, and his performance only increased the popularity of the role. He also performed the score and played a role in the Academy Award-winning film Tsotsi (2005) and the movie Drum (2004). Zola also has a prominent role in the documentary SHARP! SHARP!- the kwaito story (2003) directed by Aryan Kaganof. In 2015 and 2016 Zola had minor roles in the television series Isibaya, as well as Zabalaza.

Television

Zola 7 
Zola 7 was a television show presented by Zola airing from 2002 to 2010 on SABC1. Each episode focused on a young person, who with support from Zola realized his or her dream.

Utatakho 
Utatakho was a television programme produced by Connect TV in 2015 which aired on Mzansi Magic and was presented by Zola. In each episode Zola helped participants to find or reconnect with their biological fathers. Zola accompanied participating sons to meetings with their fathers and facilitated conversation. Additionally, a professional counsellor was present to mediate. Having been to child court over the custody for his own children, Zola can relate to the show's content on a personal level.

Hope with Zola 
Hope with Zola is a docu-reality show on Moja Love. The programme started in October 2018 and is hosted by Zola. Each episode is 30 minutes and focuses on the alleviation of social problems like youth unemployment, housing shortage or insufficient community libraries. Unlike his former show, Zola 7, which focused on individuals, Hope with Zola addresses communities and aimes specifically for sustainable development.

Music
Bonginkosi Dlamini has enjoyed success as a Kwaito superstar, and is probably the most popular Kwaito artist in the country; Lance Stehr of Ghetto Ruff records has referred to Zola as "the second biggest brand in the country next to Nelson Mandela."
Zola not only performs but also writes and produces some of his own music, signing to the independent label Ghetto Ruff records. Zola is also the owner of the music company Guluva Entertainment.

Originally, Zola was not a fan of Kwaito music, because it "had no message." He has taken upon himself to change this, viewing himself as a role model. "I want to inspire a guy from the ghetto so he can stop hanging around in the corner begging and try to get some life." In the song "Mdlwembe", which literally means problem child, he expresses his feelings about the neighborhood he grew up in. He talks about the horrible quality of life of the township, particularly the extreme level crime and violence. "Beware of the Zola boys; we do crime for money" demonstrates Zola's past and also the perpetual anguish of life in a ghetto. Today, Zola works on behalf of younger performers, helping them to be integrated into the music industry. He is a pioneer in social action and benefit projects in South Africa.

Kwaito is branded as apolitical, and often associated with the advancement of personal wealth, glamorized gangster lifestyle, and frivolous consumption themes found in much of Jamaican Dancehall and Rap.  The genre is associated with a new political freedom gain since the end of apartheid in South Africa and less political strife. The form of the Kwaito produced by Zola is in that case an anomaly in that it is very much politically charged and contains a social message.

Zola raps in isiZulu with a high usage of Tsotsitaal. The latter is the vernacular slang in South Africa. This infusion of colloquial dialect with a national language allows for better interaction between the artists and the community South Africans in lower socio-economic classes who live in the townships and speak Tsotsitaal can relate to Kwaito music differently from Cape Town hip hop or US hip hop because of the lyrics. Additionally many of his songs describe situations of life in the townships, particularly Soweto.

On 7 July 2007 Zola performed at the South African leg of Live Earth.

Radio
Dlamini is part of the newly launched Massiv Metro, an online station pioneered by DJ Sbu.

Filmography

Television 

 Yizo Yizo (season 2)
 Zola 7
 Rolling with Zola
 Zabalaza (season 3)
 aYeYe (season 1)
 Isibaya (seasons 3 and 4)
 iNkaba (season 1)
 Utatakho (season 1)
 Zaziwa (season 1)

Films 

 Drum (2004)
 Tsotsi (2005)

Discography
 Umdlwembe (2000)
 Khokhovula (2002)
 Bhambatha (2004)
 Ibutho (2005)
 Tsotsi (soundtrack of the 2005 motion picture)
 Impepho (2009)
 Unyezi (2011)
 Intathakusa (2014)

Awards
He has four South African Music Awards - SAMA
 Artist of the Year - 2002
 Best Soundtrack - Yizo Yizo
 Best Music Video - Ghetto Scandalous
 Best Kwaito Album - Umdlwembe
He also received three Metro FM Awards 2001
 Song of the Year - Ghetto Scandalous
 Best Album of the Year - Umdlwembe
 Best Kwaito Album - Umdlwembe

References

External links
Zola's Official Homepage
Interview with Zola on NPR's Talk of the Nation (7 March 2006)

South African musicians
Kwaito musicians
1977 births
Living people
South African male actors
Musicians from Johannesburg
South African male poets
South African rappers
People from Soweto